The 1990 World Men's Handball Championship was the 12th team handball World Championship. It was held in Czechoslovakia from February 28 to March 10, 1990. Sweden won the championship.

Qualification

Teams

Preliminary round

Group A

Group B

Group C

Group D

Ranking round

Main round

Group I

Group II

Placement round

Eleventh place game

Ninth place game

Seventh place game

Fifth place game

Third place game

Final

Final standings

Medal summary

Top goalscorers

External links
IHF Report
 Men Handball World Championship 1990
 Dataesport
 The Official Website of the Beijing 2008 Olympic Games - Medallists from previous World Championships

World Handball Championship tournaments
World Mens Handball Championship, 1990
World Men's Handball Championship
H
February 1990 sports events in Europe
March 1990 sports events in Europe